A calavera (Spanish –  for "skull") is a representation of a human skull. The term is most often applied to edible or decorative skulls made (usually by hand) from either sugar (called Alfeñiques) or clay, used in the Mexican celebration of the Day of the Dead and the Roman Catholic holiday All Souls' Day. Calavera can also refer to any artistic representations of skulls, such as the lithographs of José Guadalupe Posada. The most widely known calaveras are created with cane sugar and are decorated with items such as colored foil, icing, beads, and feathers. They range in multiple colors.

Traditional methods for producing calaveras have been in use since the 1630s.  The skulls are created either for children or as offerings to be placed on altars known as ofrendas ("offerings") for Día de Muertos, which has roots in the Aztec, Mayan, and Toltec cultural celebration of the "Day of the Dead".

The tradition of sugar skulls is for families to decorate their loved ones' ofrendas with both large and small handmade sugar skulls. Children who have died, represented by small sugar skulls, are celebrated on 1 November. The larger sugar skulls represent the adults, whose celebration takes place on 2 November. It is believed that the departed return home to enjoy the offering on the altar.

In pre-Columbian times, the images of skulls and skeletons were shown often in art forms to represent rebirth into the next stage of life. During the 20th century, political caricaturist José Guadalupe Posada became famous for making calaveras as vain skeletons dressed in the clothing of the wealthy. The most famous one was Catrina, wearing a feathery hat, fancy shoes and a long dress. Catrina is considered to be the personification of the Day of the Dead. These skeletons are created from many materials such as wood, sugar paste varieties, types of nuts, chocolate, etc. When used as offerings, the name of the deceased is written across the forehead of the skull on colored foil.

Production

Traditional production methods have been in use since roughly the 15th century. The process involves using molds to cast the calaveras. Production can be a lengthy process: a craftsman will usually spend roughly four to six months producing the skulls for a season. Traditionally made sugar skulls are considered folk art and are not meant to be consumed.

The production process is more focused on the aesthetic appeal of the skull than on the taste or food safety of the product. Furthermore, many calaveras feature inedible decorations, such as beads, feathers, and foil. Some skulls were formerly decorated with sombreros, although these designs have mostly disappeared since the 1970s.

The calaveras are traditionally sold at outdoor market stalls beginning two weeks before the Day of the Dead.

Other calaveras are produced to be edible. Most are cast as one piece from cane sugar, which can either be left unflavored or else flavored with vanilla. Some calaveras are also made from chocolate. The calaveras are typically colored with vegetable dyes. As with the more decorative calaveras, these will sometimes have names written on the foreheads, as well. Calaveras may be eaten, or kept for a few days and then thrown away.

Clay skulls
Clay toy variations of calaveras also resemble the shape of human skulls. These toys are often painted a metallic silver color, but they may also be found in colors such as white, black, and red. Beaded eyes of many colors may also be added for decoration.

Literary calaveras
Poetry written for the Day of the Dead are known as literary calaveras, and are intended to humorously criticize the living while reminding them of their mortality. Literary calaveras appeared during the second half of the 19th century, when drawings critical of important politicians began to be published in the press. Living personalities were depicted as skeletons exhibiting recognizable traits, making them easily identifiable. Additionally, drawings of dead personalities often contained text elements providing details of the deaths of various individuals.

Face painting 
Sometimes known as "sugar skull" make-up, or Catrina make-up, facepainting a skull with ornate elements is a popular element of Day of the Dead celebrations in Mexico.

See also
Calaca
Papel Picado
La Calavera Catrina
Santa Muerte
Manuel Calavera

References

External links

 Information about Jose Guadalupe Posada, Posada Art Foundation
 Information about calaveras de azúcar, Decalaveras Foundation
 Information about calaveras literarias, Calaveras Foundation
Spanish words and phrases
Mexican culture
Day of the Dead food